The Germany men's national sitting volleyball team represents (Germany) in international sitting volleyball competitions and friendly matches. Until 1990 team competed as West Germany in sitting volleyball.

Players
The following is the German roster in the men's volleyball tournament of the 2016 Summer Paralympics.

 SCHIFFLER Alexander
 VOGEL Martin
 SCHU Stefan
 HAHNLEIN Stefan Klaus Hans
 ALBRECHT Dominik Marcel
 WIESENTHAL Heiko
 SCHIWY Lukas
 SCHRAPP Jurgen
 HERZOG Christoph
 SAYILIR Barbaros
 TIGLER Mathis
 SCHIEWE Torben

Honours

Paralympic Games

World Championships

European Championships

Minor tournaments

Sarajevo Open Championship:

 Runners-Up (1): 2009
 3rd place (2): 2007, 2016
 4th place (3): 2010, 2012, 2014

Germany-Bosnia rivalry
Germany since team formation has been a long time European adversary to Bosnia-Herzegovina during sitting volleyball championships as teams have met at almost every major tournament in later stages of the finals.

World ranking
As at 28 September 2016.

See also

 Germany at the Paralympics
 Volleyball at the Summer Paralympics
 World Organization Volleyball for Disabled

References

Volleyball in Germany
S
National sitting volleyball teams